Nuculana concentrica, or the Concentric nut clam, is a marine bivalve mollusc in the family Nuculanidae. It can be found in the waters of the Gulf of Mexico, ranging from Texas to Florida.

References

Nuculanidae
Bivalves described in 1824